Huguette Tiegna (born 1 April 1982) is a French engineer and politician of La République En Marche! (LREM) who has been serving as a member of the French National Assembly since 18 June 2017, representing the department of Lot.

Political career
In parliament, Tiegna serves on the Committee on Economic Affairs and the Parliamentary Office for the Evaluation of Scientific and Technological Choices (OPECST). In addition to her committee assignments, she chairs the French Parliamentary Friendship Group with Burkina Faso.

See also
 2017 French legislative election

References

1982 births
Living people
Deputies of the 15th National Assembly of the French Fifth Republic
La République En Marche! politicians
21st-century French women politicians
Women members of the National Assembly (France)
Black French politicians
French people of Burkinabé descent
Burkinabé emigrants to France